Kyle Stewart may refer to:
 Kyle Stewart, the northern part of Kyle, Ayrshire
 Kyle Stewart (rugby union)